Liesel Seewald was an Austrian luger who competed during the early 1950s. She won the silver medal in the women's singles event at the 1953 European championships in Cortina d'Ampezzo, Italy.

References

External links
List of European luge champions 

Austrian female lugers
Possibly living people
Year of birth missing
20th-century Austrian women